The Merri River, a perennial river of the Glenelg Hopkins catchment, is located in the Western District of Victoria, Australia.

Course and features
Formed by the confluence of the Spring Creek and Drysdale Creek, to the east of Grassmere. It flows generally south joined by two minor tributaries before reaching its mouth and emptying into Stingray Bay, part of the Southern Ocean, near the city of Warrnambool. The river descends  over its  course. Spring Creek starts to the east of Penshurst, just north of the Hamilton Highway while Drysdale Creek starts near the Woolsthorpe-Hexham Road.

Etymology
The river derives its name from an Aboriginal word meaning "rocky".

See also

 List of rivers in Victoria
 Merri Island
 Middle Island (Warrnambool)

References

External links
 

Glenelg Hopkins catchment
Rivers of Barwon South West (region)
Warrnambool
Western District (Victoria)